Katherine Mortimer, Countess of Warwick (1314 – 4 August 1369) was the wife of Thomas de Beauchamp, 11th Earl of Warwick KG, an English peer, and military commander during the Hundred Years War. She was a daughter and co-heiress of Roger Mortimer, 1st Earl of March and Joan de Geneville, Baroness Geneville.

Sometime before 1355, she became an important figure at the royal court of King Edward III.

Family and lineage 
Katherine Mortimer was born at Ludlow Castle, Shropshire, England, in 1314, one of the twelve children and a co-heiress of Roger Mortimer, 1st Earl of March and Joan de Geneville, Baroness Geneville. Her paternal grandparents were Edmund Mortimer, 2nd Baron Mortimer and Margaret de Fiennes, and her maternal grandparents were Sir Piers de Geneville, of Trim Castle and Ludlow, and Jeanne of Lusignan.

Her father was de facto ruler of England together with his mistress Isabella of France, Queen consort of King Edward II, until his eventual capture and execution by the orders of King Edward III, eldest son of Isabella and King Edward II. The latter had been deposed in November 1326, and afterwards cruelly murdered by assassins acting under the orders of Mortimer and Queen Isabella. Katherine was sixteen years old when her father was hanged, Tyburn, London on 29 November 1330.

Marriage
On 19 April 1319, when she was about five years-old, Katherine was married to Thomas de Beauchamp, 11th Earl of Warwick, eldest son of Guy de Beauchamp, 10th Earl of Warwick and Alice de Toeni. Their marriage required a Papal dispensation as they were related within the prohibited third and fourth degrees.
Beauchamp had succeeded to the earldom at the age of two, therefore Katherine was styled Countess of Warwick from the time of her marriage until her death. The marriage had been arranged in July 1318 to settle a quarrel between the two families over the lordship of Elfael, which was thus given to Katherine as her marriage portion.
For the term of his minority, Beauchamp's custody had been granted to Katherine's father, Roger Mortimer.

Katherine later became an important personage at the court of King Edward III. As a sign of royal favour she was chosen to stand as one of the godmothers, along with Queen Philippa of Hainault, to the latter's granddaughter, Philippa, Countess of Ulster, in 1355. This honour bestowed on Katherine is described by 19th century author Agnes Strickland according to the Friar's Genealogy: "Her [Philippa, Countess of Ulster] godmother also was of Warwick Countess, a lady likewise of great worthiness".

Issue
Katherine and Beauchamp together had fifteen children:
 Guy de Beauchamp (died 28 April 1360); married Philippa de Ferrers, daughter of Henry de Ferrers, 2nd Lord Ferrers of Groby and Isabel de Verdun, by whom he had two daughters.
 Thomas de Beauchamp, 12th Earl of Warwick (16 March 1339 – 8 August 1401); married Margaret Ferrers, daughter of William Ferrers, 3rd Lord of Groby, and Margaret de Ufford, by whom he had issue, including Richard de Beauchamp, 13th Earl of Warwick.
 William Beauchamp, 1st Baron Bergavenny (c. 1343 – 8 May 1411); inherited the honour of Abergavenny. On 23 July 1392, married Lady Joan FitzAlan, daughter of Richard Fitzalan, 11th Earl of Arundel and Elizabeth de Bohun, by whom he had a son, Richard de Beauchamp, 1st Earl of Worcester, and a daughter, Joan de Beauchamp, 4th Countess of Ormonde. Queen consort Anne Boleyn was a notable descendant of the latter.
 Roger de Beauchamp (died 1361)
 Maud de Beauchamp (died 1403); married Roger de Clifford, 5th Baron de Clifford, by whom she had issue, including Thomas de Clifford, 6th Baron de Clifford.
 Philippa de Beauchamp; married Hugh de Stafford, 2nd Earl of Stafford, by whom she had nine children.
 Alice Beauchamp (died 1383); married firstly John Beauchamp, 3rd Baron Beauchamp of Somerset, and secondly Sir William Gournay. She died childless.
 Joan de Beauchamp; married Ralph Basset, 3rd Baron Basset of Drayton. She died childless.
 Isabella de Beauchamp (died 29 September 1416); married firstly John le Strange, 5th Baron Strange, and secondly, William de Ufford, 2nd Earl of Suffolk. Upon the latter's death, she became a nun. She died childless.
 Margaret de Beauchamp; married Guy de Montfort, and after his death, she became a nun. She died childless.
 Elizabeth de Beauchamp; married Thomas de Ufford KG.
 Anne de Beauchamp; married Walter de Cokesey.
 Juliana de Beauchamp
 Katherine de Beauchamp; became a nun at Shouldham Priory.

Death and effigy 
Katherine Mortimer died on 4 August 1369 at the age of about fifty-five. Two years before her death, in 1367, Katherine was a legatee in the will of her sister Agnes de Hastings, Countess of Pembroke. Katherine was buried in St. Mary's Church, Warwick, Warwickshire. She lies alongside her husband, who died three months after her of the Black Death. Their tomb with well-preserved, alabaster effigies can be seen in the centre of the quire. Katherine is depicted wearing a frilled veil with a honeycomb pattern and she is holding hands with Beauchamp. The sides of the tomb chest are decorated with figures of mourners, both male and female.

Ancestry

Images

References

Works cited
 

1314 births
1369 deaths
14th-century English nobility
14th-century English women
People from Ludlow
English countesses
Daughters of British earls
Wives of knights
Katherine
Katherine